Karan-Bishindy (Qaran-Bişende) is a rural locality (a village) in Verkhnebishindinsky Selsoviet, Tuymazinsky District, Bashkortostan, Russia. The population was 168 as of 2010. There are 2 streets.

Geography 
Karan-Bishindy is located 16 km south of Tuymazy (the district's administrative centre) by road. Verkhniye Bishindy is the nearest rural locality.

References 

Rural localities in Tuymazinsky District